Hemilissopsis clenchi is a species of beetle in the family Cerambycidae. It was described by Lane in 1959.

References

Elaphidiini
Beetles described in 1959